The Girl from 10th Avenue is a 1935 American drama film directed by Alfred E. Green. The screenplay by Charles Kenyon is based on the 1914 play Outcast by Hubert Henry Davies. The film was released in the United Kingdom as Men on Her Mind.

Plot
Geoffrey Sherwood, rejected by Valentine French in favor of wealthier suitor John Marland, watches her wedding from outside the church. Inebriated, he becomes increasingly louder, drawing the attention of two policemen as well as Miriam Brady, a shopgirl on her lunch hour, who takes Geoff to a cafe to spare him from arrest. There they encounter Hugh Brown and Tony Hewlitt, two of his society friends, who offer Miriam $100 to keep an eye on Geoffrey and make sure he stays out of trouble.

The following morning the couple discover that while under the influence of alcohol they were married by a justice of the peace. Miriam offers to give her new husband his freedom, but he decides to remain with her. They set up housekeeping in an apartment in a lower-class neighborhood, and while Geoff starts his own business, Miriam tries to improve herself with the assistance of Mrs. Martin, her landlady and a former showgirl.

With his bride helping him to stay sober, Geoff succeeds and the marriage remains solid until Valentine decides she wants him back. Miriam confronts the woman in a restaurant and their ensuing argument is reported in the newspaper. Miriam leaves Geoff who, realizing he truly loves her, tells Valentine they have no future together, finds his wife, and gives her a wedding band as a sign of his commitment to their marriage.

Cast
Bette Davis as Miriam Brady
Ian Hunter as Geoffrey Sherwood
Katharine Alexander as Valentine French
Colin Clive as John Marland
John Eldredge as Hugh Brown
Phillip Reed as Tony Hewlett
Alison Skipworth as Mrs. Martin

Production
This was the fourth screen adaptation of the Hubert Henry Davies play Outcast, which had run for 168 performances at the Lyceum Theatre on Broadway. The first film version was made in 1917 with Anna Murdock and David Powell.

Powell reprised his role in the 1922 film version opposite Elsie Ferguson, who had starred in the original Broadway production. The 1928 version, with a Vitaphone score and sound effects, starred Corinne Griffith and Edmund Lowe.

Critical reception
Variety wrote the film "is fashioned from a pattern whose every turn and twist the dullest fan can easily anticipate...Narrative is chockful of implausible sequences and the plot...often gets itself into blind alleys. But deft direction plus smooth trouping by Davis make these defects not too noticeable."

References

External links
 
 
 

1935 films
1935 romantic drama films
American black-and-white films
American romantic drama films
American films based on plays
Films directed by Alfred E. Green
Films set in New York City
Warner Bros. films
Films scored by Heinz Roemheld
1930s English-language films
1930s American films